Muhammad bin Muhammad al-Fassi (commonly known as Qutbul Ujud Imam Fassi) (1760?–1863) was the originator of the Fassi family of Sheikhs who constitute the Fassiyatush Shadhiliyya Sufi order.

Early life
Fassi was born either in the year 1173 Hijri (ca 1760 CE) or 1218 Hijri in Fes in Morocco, from which the family name "al-Fassi" had earlier been derived. His mother died during his very childhood. He was a hafiz al-Quran during his childhood and travelled to various parts of the world and finally Makkah in search of wisdom.

Names
Imam Fassi can be briefly referred to as Qutbul Ujud or Qutbul Ujud Hazrat Fassi. Some of the full versions of his name include Qutbur Rabbani, Haikalus Samadhani, Qutbul ujood, Abu Abdullah Seiyaduna Muhammad bin Muhammad bin Masood bin Abdur Rahman al-Makki al-Hasani al-Idrissi al-Fassi ash-Shadhili (Rali.) or Hazrat Qutbul Ujud Seyyidina Mohammad al-Fassy ash-Shadhili (Rah...).

Education
Imam Fassi travelled to Mecca to memorise and learn the Quran with tajwid. He travelled to many places in search of good preachers. His main sheikh was Sidi al-Sheikh Muhammad bin Hamzah al-Madani (Sheikh Qutb Mohammad bin Hamza lafir al-Madani (Rali…)).

Fassiyatush Shadhiliyya

Imam Fassi and his descendants form a branch of Shadhiliyya which is the only tariqush Shukr (Order of Gratitude).

The Spiritual Chain 
The silsila of the Fassiyatush Shadhiliyya order (called as Silsilat ad dhahab) is as follows:
 Allah Rabbul Izza
 Jibra'il
 Muhammad
 Ali ibn Abi Talib
 Imam Hasan
 Abu Muhammad Jaabir
 Sa'eed Al Ghazwani
 Abu Muhammad Fath as Su'ud
 Abu Muhammad Sa'ad
 Abi Muhammad Sa'eed
 Abu al Qasim bin Marwan
 Is'haq Ibrahim al Basari
 Zainuddin al Qazwini
 Syedi Shamsuddin
 Syedi Tajuddin
 Syedi Noruddin
 Syedi Fakhruddin
 Tuqaiyuddin al fukhair
 Abdur Rahman al madani al Attar Az zayyat
 Abd as-Salam ibn Mashish al-Alami ash Shahid
 Imam Noruddin Abul Hasan Alee ash-Shadhili
 Abul Abbas al-Mursi
 Ahmed bin Ata’ullah Al Iskandari
 Dawood Al Bakhili
 Muhammad Wafa
 Ali Wafa 
 Yahya al Qadiri
 Ahmed bin Uqba Al hadhrami
 Sheikh Shihabuddin Abul Abbas Ahmed Zarruq Al Fassi
 Ibrahim Ithaam
 Alee Sanhani
 Abdur Rahman al Majdhubi (Majzoubi)
 Yusuf al-Fassi
 Syed Muhammad
 Abdur Rahman al Fassi
 Qasim al Ikhlasi
 Ahmad ibn Abdhullah al Fassi
 Arabi ibn Ahmed bin Abdullah Sahib al Maqfiyya
 Ali al Jamal al Imrani
 Muhammad al Arabi bin Ahmed ad Darqawi
 Muhammad ibn Hamza Dhafir al-Madani
 Muhammad (al Ajwad) b. Muhammad b. Masood b. Abdur rahman al Makki al Idrissi al Fassi ash Shadhili (Imam Fassi)
 Shamsuddin Makki ibn Muhammad al Fassi
 Ahmad al Arabi
 Muhammad Ibraheem Fassi ibn Shamsuddin Makki al Fassi
 Abdullah al Fassi ibn Shamsuddin Makki al Fassi
 Dr. Muhammad ibn Mohammad Ibrahim al Fassi
 Abdul Wahab al Fassi ibn Mohammed Ibrahim al Fassi ash Shadhili
 Abdul Qadir al Fassi ibn Muhammad Ibrahim al Fassi ash Shadhili
 Najmul Ulema Hazrat Ajwad ibn Abdallah al Fassi ash Shadhili (Present day Sheikh us Sujjadah of Fassiyatush shadhiliyya Sufi order. He lives in Makkah).

References

Saudi Arabian Muslims
Shadhili order
People from Fez, Morocco
Moroccan Sufis
Saudi Arabian Sufis
Saudi Arabian people of Moroccan descent